Stickfighter is a 1994 American action B movie directed by BJ Davis and starring Kely McClung who also wrote the story. It was released in the US in 1997.

Plot
Kely McClung stars as John Lambert, a D.E.A. agent whose partner loses his life in a sting operation gone wrong. Lambert quits the force to cope with this loss.

Cast
Kely McClung as John Lambert
Alex Meneses (as Paula Vargas) as Luella Cartegenas
Karl Johnson as Dirk Riley
Jeff Celentano (as Jeff Weston) as James Tucker
Robert Pralgo as Robert Reves
Scott Sullivan as Arvo Riley
Roger Callard as Lt. Davis
Darcy DeMoss (as Darcey DeMoss) as Michelle Madsen

References

External links
Stickfighter on Internet Movie Database

1994 action films